Up Your Brass is an album by the Dan McMillion Jazz Orchestra that was released in 2002 by Sea Breeze Records.  By 2005, this was one of five albums the group had released gaining critical acclaim.

Critical reception and professional ratings 

"Dan McMillion’s explosive Florida–based Jazz Orchestra is back with another colorful scrapbook of straight–ahead big–band Jazz sketched in the image of his main men, Maynard Ferguson, Buddy Rich and Woody Herman (if one must have role models he may as well choose the best)."

Jack Bowers, All About Jazz

Track listing

Personnel

Musicians
 Dan McMillion – conductor, trumpet
 Pete Mongaya – guitar
 Richard Drexler – piano
 Chris Queenan – bass
 Gerald Myles – drums
 Nemil Chabeebe – percussion
 Saxes and woodwinds – Valerie Gillespie, Mike Bibilisco, Mike McArthur, Tom Dietz, Buthc Evans
 Trumpets and flugelhorns – Chad Shoopman (lead), John Robinson, Andy Reese, Matt White, Wayne Daughtry
 Trombones – Keith Oshiro (lead), Chris Price, Marius Dicpetris, Bob Medlin

Production
 Recording engineers – Tom Morris, Jim Morris, Mark Prator, Matt Shoopman, Keith Oshiro
 Mastering – Tom Morris, Sonic Solutions
 Liner notes– Alun Morgan
 Photography – Tim Hubbard
 Cover art and design – Scott Howard

References

External links
 Up Your Brass at All Music Guide
 
 
 
 Dan McMillion Jazz Orchestra (web site)

2002 albums
Jazz albums by American artists
Big band albums